C. Narayanaswamy is a former MP (1996–97) having represented Bangalore North Constituency. He is currently associated with Indian National Congress (INC).

Political career

Narayanaswamy was a member of the Janata Dal (Secular) and became Bangalore North's MP between the years 1996-1998 representing it. He joined the Indian National Congress on 15 August 2013. Narayanaswamy is the Indian National Congress' candidate for the 2014 Lok Sabha Elections.

Narayanaswamy was elected to Lok Sabha from Bangalore North Constituency with a margin of 1.3 lakh (130 thousand) votes.

Narayanaswamy also served as the President of Bangalore Rural Zilla Parishad..

Positions held
 Member of Parliament (Eleventh Lok Sabha – Bangalore North Constituency) 1996-98
 Working President, Karnataka Panchayati Parishad 2011 - till date
 President, Bangalore Rural ZillaParishad 1987-92
 Chairman, Karnataka Food & Civil Supplies Corporation 1985-86
 Vice President,Taluk Development Board 1978-83

Awards and recognition

 Recipient of the Karnataka State 'Sahakara Rathna Award' for 2007
 Recipient of Shri Ramakrishna Hegde Award for 2010–2011
 As a sportsman and professional weightlifter, captained and represented Bangalore University in many national sports events

References

External links
 Official website

Year of birth missing (living people)
Living people
Indian National Congress politicians
Politicians from Bangalore
India MPs 1996–1997
Lok Sabha members from Karnataka
Karnataka district councillors
People from Bangalore Rural district
Janata Dal politicians
Janata Dal (Secular) politicians
Janata Party politicians